Enteromius okae is a species of cyprinid fish that is endemic to the Republic of Congo. It is only known from Oka River but the fish may be more widespread. It is hunted for food but no exact threats are known.

References 

Enteromius
Cyprinid fish of Africa
Taxa named by Henry Weed Fowler
Fish described in 1949
Endemic fauna of the Democratic Republic of the Congo